Stanimir Belomazhev is a Bulgarian athlete in ski orienteering and cross-country skiing. While he started out as a skier, his greatest success came in ski orienteering, being there a three-times European champion and double World vice-champion.
In February 2016 he won three titles at the first World Student Ski Orienteering Championships in Tula, Russia, in sprint, middle and pursuit. 

in March 2016 he won bronze in long distance (28.5 km) at the European Ski Orienteering Championships (Obertilliach, Austria).

References

External links
 

Bulgarian orienteers
Male orienteers
Ski-orienteers
1988 births
Living people